Linda Lawson may refer to:

Linda Lawson (politician), American politician in Indiana
Linda Lawson (actress), American actress